Bío Bío is an underground metro station on the Line 6 of the Santiago Metro, in Santiago, Chile. This station is named for the station is located steps from the La Aguada Flood Park and the mentioned commercial district, one of the oldest in the city. The station was opened on 2 November 2017 as part of the inaugural section of the line, between Cerrillos and Los Leones.

It is expected that by 2030 this station will be combined with the future Line 9.

References

Santiago Metro stations
Santiago Metro Line 6